The Abraham Miller House, near Stanford, Kentucky, was listed on the National Register of Historic Places in 2001.

It is uses saddlebag architecture, a two-room one-story log building built between 1785 and 1815.

References

National Register of Historic Places in Lincoln County, Kentucky
Log buildings and structures on the National Register of Historic Places in Kentucky
Houses completed in 1800
1800 establishments in Kentucky
Log houses in the United States
Double pen architecture
Houses on the National Register of Historic Places in Kentucky